Tocoyena is a genus of plant in family Rubiaceae.

Species 
Tocoyena contains the following species (incomplete list):
 Tocoyena atlantica  R. Borges & Gaem
Tocoyena brasiliensis Mart.
Tocoyena bullata (Vell.) Mart.
Tocoyena foetida Poepp. & Endl.
Tocoyena formosa (Cham. & Schltdl.) K. Schum.
Tocoyena guyanensis K. Schum.
Tocoyena pittieri (Standl.) Standl.
Tocoyena selloana Schum.
Tocoyena sellowiana (Cham. & Schltdl.) K. Schum.

References 

 
Rubiaceae genera
Taxonomy articles created by Polbot